The 1994 CFL Draft composed of six rounds and 49 Canadian football players that were chosen from eligible Canadian universities as well as Canadian players playing in the NCAA.

Supplemental Selections

Round one

Round two

Round three

Round four

Round five

Round six

External links 
 

Canadian College Draft
Cfl Draft, 1994